Blessingbourne House is a large Elizabethan style manor-house situated in parkland near Fivemiletown in County Tyrone, Northern Ireland.

The present house was designed by Frederick Pepys Cockerell and constructed between 1870 and 1874. It is built in an Elizabethan style of grey stone overlooking Lough Fadda and is surrounded by gardens with yew trees, a gravel terrace and a rhododendron walk. Woodland trails lead round the lake. The entire estate now comprises some s and is a working farm.
In recent times the coach house has been made available for private functions and the outbuildings converted to holiday apartments. An 8 km mountain bike trail has been newly laid out.

History
The Blessingbourne estate came to the Montgomery family by marriage to the Armar family in the early 18th century. However the first Montgomery to actually live on the estate was Hugh Montgomery, known as "Colonel Eclipse", who was born in 1779. He vowed he would never marry and built himself a romantic thatched cottage on the estate as a bachelor retreat. He did give way however and had a son, Hugh Ralph Severin Montgomery, who built a Tudor style gate lodge c.1845 when he succeeded to the property in 1838.

The larger present house was built by the latter's only son, Hugh de Fellenberg Montgomery, who employed Frederick Pepys Cockerell as his architect. Building stated soon after his marriage in 1870 and finished in 1874.

It descended in the family to Peter Montgomery, Vice-Lord Lieutenant of Tyrone, who died childless, after which it passed to a cousin. The property was ultimately inherited by Captain Robert Lowry, a direct descendant of Colonel Eclipse, and now belongs to Colleen and Nicholas Lowry.

References

Country houses in Northern Ireland
Buildings and structures in County Tyrone